The Leningrad Naval Base is part of the Baltic Fleet of the Russian Navy.

History
The Naval base was created on the basis of Order No. 117 as of March 15, 1919 of the Baltic Sea Fleet. The Naval Forces of Petrograd were transformed by the order into the Petrograd Naval Base.
The Petrograd, then the Leningrad naval base has since that time been sometimes abolished, reformed and again created.

During the Great Patriotic War from the headquarters of the naval educational institutions and fleet units a sea defence of Leningrad and Lake area headquarters was created. About 100,000 military seamen fought on the Leningrad front. In 1941-1944 naval vessels of this base participated in carrying out of landing operations in areas Strelna, Peterhof, on Lake Ladoga, in the Vyborg and in the Narva gulfs. During the blockade of Leningrad the fleet provided communication of the besieged city with the country through Lake Ladoga. 1.7 million tons of cargo were transported and 1 million people were evacuated on the water line of the Road of Life alone.

From October 1988 the base consisted of the:
25th Submarine Brigade (Kronshtadt, Saint Petersburg)
105th Naval Region Protection Brigade (Kronshtadt, Saint Petersburg)
166th Brigade of Constructed and Overhauled Ships (Kronshtadt, Saint Petersburg)

Since 1994 the base has been part of the Baltic Fleet.

Ships in 2008

Commanders 
During Soviet times, the post was known as the Commandant of the Kronstadt naval fortress.

 Admiral  (December 1989 - September 1992)
 Vice Admiral  (February 1993 - August 1995)
 Vice Admiral Alexander Kornilov (December 1995 - October 2002)
 Vice Admiral Vladimir Kudryavtsev (October 2002 - March 2006)
 Rear Admiral Alexey Tuzov (March - November 2006)
 Rear Admiral Anatoly Lipinsky (November 2006 - July 2009)
 Rear Admiral Aleksandr Fedotenkov (September 2009 - June 2011)
 Captain Oleg Zhuravlyov (December 2011 - May 2015)
 Rear Admiral  (May 2015 - September 2017)
 Rear Admiral Vyacheslav Rodionov (since September 2017)

References

External links

Russian and Soviet Navy bases
Russian and Soviet Navy submarine bases